He Zhukang (born 1932) is a People's Republic of China politician. He was born in Qidong, Jiangsu. He was a delegate to the 6th National People's Congress (1983–1988), 7th National People's Congress (1988–1993) and 8th National People's Congress (1993–1998). He was governor of Henan and Chinese Communist Party Committee Secretary, People's Congress Chairman and governor of Jilin.

References

1932 births
Living people
People's Republic of China politicians from Jiangsu
Chinese Communist Party politicians from Jiangsu
Governors of Henan
Governors of Jilin
Delegates to the 6th National People's Congress
Delegates to the 7th National People's Congress
Delegates to the 8th National People's Congress
People from Qidong, Jiangsu
Sportspeople from Nantong